Eulalia aurea is a grass (in the Poaceae family). It was first described as Andropogon aureum in 1804 by Bory de Saint-Vincent but was transferred to the genus, Eulalia, in 1830 by Kunth.

Distribution 
It is found in southern Africa, Madagascar, Southeast Asia, and Australia. Within Australia, it is found in all mainland states and territories.

Gallery

References

External links
Eulalia aurea occurrence data from GBIF

Flora of Madagascar
Flora of Indo-China
Flora of Australia
Andropogoneae